The Batman Who Laughs (Bruce Wayne) is a supervillain appearing in American comic books published by DC Comics. He is the evil counterpart and alternate version of Batman within the Dark Multiverse. He is depicted as a hybrid of both Batman (Bruce Wayne) and Batman's arch enemy Joker, and is a member of the Dark Knights and the overarching antagonist of the Dark Multiverse Saga, alongside cosmic deities Perpetua and Barbatos, from 2017 to 2021, following DC Rebirth. His first appearance was in the crossover storyline Dark Nights: Metal, before receiving his own series and serving as the main antagonist in Batman/Superman in 2019 and DC Comics' Year of the Villain alongside Lex Luthor. He was created by Scott Snyder and Greg Capullo. His name is an allusion both to the original Batman’s seriousness and to the 1928 film The Man Who Laughs featuring Conrad Veidt, by whose performance the Joker is inspired.

Publication history
The Batman Who Laughs was created by Scott Snyder and Greg Capullo first appearing in the comic book Dark Days: The Casting. The character was depicted as an alternate universe Batman who does not have a code against killing. Snyder explained his intent on the character in an interview by The Hollywood Reporter: "He's basically Batman's worst nightmare come to life: Batman, if he was infected by the Joker toxin and lost all sense of ethics. What he wants to do in Gotham is bring Bruce’s worst nightmares to life". Snyder's hope was that his character would be popular enough to get his own comic book series, and Snyder believed that Jock "would be the perfect person to do it".

Fictional character biography

The Batman Who Laughs is a version of Batman from Earth -22 of the Dark Multiverse. In that reality, the Earth -22 Joker learns of Batman's identity as Bruce Wayne and kills most of Batman's other rogues, along with Commissioner Gordon. He then subjects thousands of Gotham City's citizens to the chemicals that transformed him, subsequently killing several parents in front of their children to mock Bruce. Batman accidentally kills Joker during their struggle, releasing a concentrated form of the toxin in Joker's body. This purified form of the chemicals gradually twists him into a new fusion of Batman and the Joker, one with Bruce Wayne's intelligence and physical strength and the Joker's psychopathy and warped, sadistic sense of humor. The process proves irreversible by the time Batman discovers what is happening to him. The Batman Who Laughs proceeds to take over Earth -22, killing off most of his allies and turning his son Damian Wayne into a mini-Joker, while recruiting the children infected by the Joker Toxin as his "Rabid Robins". The Batman Who Laughs acts as the leader or second-in-command of Barbatos' Dark Knights and recruits the other members.

After arriving on Prime-Earth (Earth 0), the Batman Who Laughs takes control of Gotham and oversees events at the Challenger's mountain. He distributes joker cards to the Batman's Rogues, giving them the ability to alter reality and take over sections of the city. Accompanying him are Dark Damian and three Rabid Robins, having intended to destroy all of reality by linking the Over-Monitor to Anti-Monitor's astral brain. The Batman Who Laughs is defeated when the Prime Universe Batman is aided by the Joker, who notes the alternate Batman's failure to perceive this scenario due to still being a version of Batman.

While assumed dead, The Batman Who Laughs is revealed to be in the custody of Lex Luthor, who offers him a place in the Legion of Doom. At some point during the formation of the Legion of Doom, Joker met with Lex Luthor and advised him not to bring the Batman Who Laughs into the group. The Batman Who Laughs talks to Lex Luthor about the worlds beyond the Source Wall as Joker listens in.

The Batman Who Laughs eventually resumes his attack on Batman, drawing in a string of alternate versions of Bruce Wayne to taunt his counterpart as he prepares for a mass assault on Batman. As an additional asset, the Batman Who Laughs is allied with the Grim Knight, a version of Batman who uses guns and turned his Gotham into a military dictatorship. With no other way to stop his other self, Batman is forced to 'accept' a twisted 'transfusion' from the Joker that begins to turn him into a variation of the Batman Who Laughs, attempting to fight it down while relying on the psychosis of the technically-treated James Gordon Jr. to try to predict his foe. When the Batman Who Laughs draws in a version of Bruce Wayne who has not even lost his parents yet, Batman is able to defeat his other self by luring him into a confrontation in the Waynes' graveyard, with Alfred subsequently using a transfusion from the other Bruce to restore Batman to normal before he is sent home and the Batman Who Laughs is locked up in the Hall of Justice dungeon. However, his serums did manage to infect Shazam, Blue Beetle, Donna Troy, Hawkman, Supergirl and Commissioner Gordon (the latter was infected during issue 7 of The Batman Who Laughs miniseries by Scott Snyder).

A year later, The Batman Who Laughs is still locked up in the Hall of Justice, but with the help of his new Secret Six he begins to set his plan in motion. He starts by having Commissioner Gordon lead Batman and Superman to the cave under Crime Alley where King Shazam will infect Superman. Later, Superman appears seemingly "infected" (with Batman listening in), making their way to the Hall of Justice weapons room. The Batman Who Laughs tells Superman that he plans to infect the world with his serum. He then makes an off-handed comment to Clark that his plan will be like the destruction of Krypton and Lois and Jon won't survive. Superman attacks The Batman Who Laughs, seemingly blowing his cover. The whole thing was revealed to be an illusion by Batman, with The Batman Who Laughs praising him saying that he had a similar system on his own world. The Batman Who Laughs' next step is having Scarab (the infected Blue Beetle) hack the Fortress of Solitude and Batcave computers. As this is happening, he begins taunting Clark saying that they were all evil inside and that he will soon know, but as Superman is about to be infected Supergirl catches the tainted Batarang and is unwittingly infected (as the batarang was designed to infect Kryptonians). As the Legion of Doom signal shines in the sky, The Batman Who Laughs muses to himself that he is on a collision course with Lex Luthor, but isn't too concerned because as he puts it, "Batman always wins".

In the Watchmen sequel Doomsday Clock, the Batman Who Laughs is among the villains who are analyzed by Doctor Manhattan when Guy Gardner uses his power ring to show the constructs of villains that they have faced.

During the "Dark Nights: Death Metal" storyline, The Batman Who Laughs becomes Perpetua's lieutenant. Aided by an army of evil Batmen from the Dark Multiverse called the Dark Knights (consisting of Baby Batman, Batmansaurus Rex, Batmobeast, Castle Bat, and Robin King), they enforce her rule. When Wonder Woman decides the best course of action is to make the first Anti-Crisis following a talk with Wally West, she is confronted by the Batman Who Laughs, whom she proceeds to gut with an invisible Chainsaw of Truth. Though dead, the Dark Knights set to work to unleash the Batman Who Laughs' true plan: preparing the body of the final Bruce Wayne. This body happens to be Batmanhattan, a version of Bruce Wayne who copied the formula that created Doctor Manhattan. 

At Castle Bat, the Dark Knights succeed in transferring the Batman Who Laughs' brain into Batmanhattan, an action that may have repercussions if Perpetua were to find out. After Perpetua warns the Batman Who Laughs of the beings like her who may sense her actions (worried they might destroy her), he proceeds to wipe out the remaining Dark Knights with the exception of Robin King. The Batman Who Laughs then shifts into a new form called the "Darkest Knight" exclaiming that he knows Diana plans to remake the Multiverse, he however wants to create "52 Planets of Nightmares". 

The Darkest Knight and the Robin King break into Valhalla Cemetery. Knowing that they are after Wally's power, Jay Garrick, Barry Allen, and Wally West run with the Darkest Knight giving chase. Barry, Wally, and Jay team up with Kid Flash and the rest of the Flash family to outrun the Darkest Knight and his army of Dark Multiverse Flashes in order to reach the Mobius Chair. 

After some convincing from Wonder Woman who traveled back in time to the Infinite Crisis, Superboy-Prime shatters the Crisis worlds, saving Batman and Superman in the process, and directs all energy to Wally, but it does not work. Before they had a chance, the Darkest Knight rigged the Mobius Chair so it would always direct the power to himself. He has everything he needs to remake the Multiverse in his own image called the Last 52. With his new god-like powers, the Darkest Knight orders Castle Bat (which turns into a colossal Batman) to attack the heroes. The heroes stand no chance against the giant whose structure is made of every material in Kane County. 

After Lex gives Wonder Woman a journal that was written by Carter Hall, the Darkest Knight (who was unable to get free of Perpetua) sends his evil Earths out to kill the united army of heroes and villains. As Batman uses the Black Lantern ring to recreate The Batman Who Laughs' body to fight for him, the battle between Perpetua and the Darkest Knight rages as the celestial being chastises the former Dark Knight by claiming she's the only one protecting the Multiverse from detection from her kind. The Darkest Knight proceeds to trap Perpetua in the fragments of the Source Wall that originally held her and kill her. Realigning the Prime Earth so the Crisis Energy continues to empower him, he sends his "favorite soldiers" to attack Earth's heroes in their last moments while also reviving Devastator, Drowned, and Red Death. 

As the heroes stand as one universe against the horde of the Darkest Knight, they start remembering their entire history as a golden-clad Wonder Woman erupts from the ground to confront the Darkest Knight. A final battle clashes between the golden-clad Wonder Woman and the Darkest Knight; a battle that spans across time and space. She is finally brought to the birth of creation where the Darkest Knight reveals that Perpetua's people (referred to as the "Hands") will simply erase the universe and without a restart, half of Diana's friends will be dead. Diana has two choices: keep fighting and lose or surrender to the Darkest Knight and use their combined power to kill the Hands. 

Refusing to give up, Diana strikes back at the Darkest Knight, pushing him forward through time, sending him into the dying embers of Earth's sun. Seeing the Hands arrive and her friends struggle like Batman resurrecting his Bat-Family and foes against the Robin King where B-Rex and Batmage were resurrected and Lex sacrificing himself to save Superman from the evil Last Sun, Diana imagines the Universe young and alive again and shoves the Darkest Knight into the sun, killing him once and for all.

Powers and abilities
The Batman Who Laughs is depicted as having the same abilities as Batman, combined with the twisted nihilism of the Joker. This contributed to the reasons why Batman was forced to ally with the Joker to stop his counterpart, as he anticipated that his other self retained his existing tactical abilities and therefore an alliance between Batman and the Joker was the only thing his counterpart could never anticipate. Hailing from the Dark Multiverse, he is able to see people's dark urges and fears, visualized as alternate realities of their current actions. His characteristic metal crown functions as a futuristic visor made out of "Dark Metal", allowing him to filter these actions and pinpoint his opponents' next moves during combat and manipulate them psychologically by using his knowledge of their fears. Unlike Batman, he opts for lethal weapons that allow him to kill swiftly, including but not limited to machine guns, knives, a chain weapon with a batarang attached at the end, and an assortment of bladed weapons.

The Batman Who Laughs also uses batarangs made of "Dark Metal" that can bring out the worst version of the victim. He used these when he created a new incarnation of the Secret Six using infected Justice League members. 

During the events of Dark Knights: Death Metal, The Batman Who Laughs gains the powers of Dr. Manhattan by having Dr. Arkham surgically integrate his mind into that of a Bruce Wayne with Manhattan’s powers, granting him nigh-omnipotence, flight, and teleportation among other powers. After absorbing Wally West’s Manhattan powers, his power drastically increases.

Like other inhabitants of the Dark Multiverse, The Batman Who Laughs has a weakness to Nth Metal.

Reception

The Batman Who Laughs has been commonly described as "horrifying" by website authors. Comic Book Resources describes The Batman Who Laughs as comprising all the "best" parts of Batman and the "worst" parts of the Joker.

The character has been compared to Judge Death in design. Scott Snyder, the creator of The Batman Who Laughs, noted that the two characters have a similar aesthetic.

In other media

Video games
 In Mortal Kombat 11, The Batman Who Laughs was used as a DLC skin for Noob Saibot with the Elseworld Skin Pack exclusive to Kombat Pack owners upon the release of the Joker as DLC.
In Injustice: Gods Among Us mobile, The Batman Who Laughs is a playable character (being considered a version of the Joker).
 In DC Universe Online, The Batman Who Laughs is the primary antagonist in the Metal Part I episode. Through his machinations, the heroes are tricked into delivering special metal to his multiversal spire which begins to drag Earth into the Dark Multiverse. He returns in Metal Part II, attempts to Joker toxin bomb the Oblivion Bar with the assembled heroes inside, but was ultimately defeated along with the other Dark Knights and Barbatos in the Dark Multiverse.
 The Batman Who Laughs appears as an outfit in the shooter game Fortnite while also having a first appearance at the end of the sixth issue of the Batman/Fortnite Zero Point comic, and has an important role in the sequel to the comics Batman/Fortnite Foundation.

Board games 
The Batman Who Laughs Rising is a 2020 cooperative, strategy dice game from The Op.

Merchandise
Knight Models has a line of gaming miniatures based on the DC comics run. Funko has released action figures of the character. Various figures from companies such as Diamond Select Toys and Prime 1 Studios have produced figures as well. McFarlane Toys has also made a version of The Batman Who Laughs for their new DC Multiverse line of 7 inch figure. McFarlane Toys also made a 5 inch Super Powers figure of The Batman Who Laughs in 2022.

References

External links
 The Batman Who Laughs at DC Comics Wiki

DC Comics male supervillains
DC Comics martial artists
DC Comics metahumans
DC Comics characters who can move at superhuman speeds
DC Comics characters who can teleport 
DC Comics characters who are shapeshifters
DC Comics characters who have mental powers
DC Comics characters with accelerated healing
DC Comics characters with superhuman senses
DC Comics characters with superhuman strength
DC Comics telekinetics 
DC Comics telepaths
Alternative versions of Batman
Characters created by Greg Capullo
Comics characters introduced in 2017
2018 comics debuts
2019 comics endings
Fictional blade and dart throwers
Fictional characters with precognition
Fictional characters who can manipulate time
Fictional characters who can manipulate reality 
Fictional characters who can manipulate light
Fictional characters with nuclear or radiation abilities
Fictional characters who can change size
Fictional characters who can duplicate themselves
Fictional characters with elemental transmutation abilities
Fictional characters with energy-manipulation abilities
Fictional characters who can turn intangible
Fictional characters with immortality
Fictional characters with elemental and environmental abilities
Fictional characters with dimensional travel abilities
Fictional characters with disfigurements
Fictional characters with electric or magnetic abilities
Fictional characters with X-ray vision
Fictional chain fighters
Fictional mass murderers
Fictional nihilists
Joker (character)
DC Comics titles
Fictional characters from parallel universes